DWSL (96.7 FM), broadcasting as 96.7 K-Lite, is a music radio station owned and operated by Beta Broadcasting System. The station's studio and transmitter are located at #8 Kessing St., New Asinan, Olongapo, Zambales. It operates daily from 5:00 AM to 12:00 MN.

References

Radio stations in Olongapo
Adult contemporary radio stations in the Philippines
Radio stations established in 1990
1990 establishments in the Philippines